FMP may refer to:

Entertainment
 For My Pain..., a Finnish gothic metal band
 Fox Movies Premium, an Asian movie channel
 Free Music Production, a German jazz record label
 Full Moon Productions, a defunct American record label
 Full Metal Panic!, a 1998 Japanese light novel, manga and anime series

Politics
 Federal Music Project, a New Deal program of the United States federal government
 Fren Melanesian Party, a political party in Vanuatu
 Fronte Marco Polo, a defunct political party in Italy
 Portuguese Maximalist Federation, a defunct revolutionary movement in Portugal

Other
 Fe'fe' language, spoken in Cameroon
 FileMaker Pro, a cross-platform database application
 Finite model property, in logic
 Forum of Mathematics, Pi, a mathematical journal
 Freestyle Music Park, in Myrtle Beach, South Carolina, United States
 Full Moon Party, a monthly event on Ko Pha Ngan, Thailand
 KK FMP, an ABA League basketball club based in Belgrade, Serbia
 KK FMP (1991–2011), a defunct Serbian basketball club